Paphiopedilum glaucophyllum, common name shiny green leaf paphiopedilum or tropical lady's-slipper, is a species of flowering plant in the  genus Paphiopedilum of the family Orchidaceae.

Description 
The upper sepal is green and purple striped, the lateral petals are twisted, purple mottled and hairy, the labellum is white at the base, with a progressively increasing pink-purple dotting. The labellum reaches  and its shape resembles a bag or women's shoes (hence the common name of Tropical Ladys-Slipper). This species blooms repeatedly with two flowers, producing a new one once the old one is fallen. The flowering period is very long, extending from the Spring till the Winter. This species is very similar to Paphiopedilum liemianum, but the last one has intense green leaves, while in the first one  they are clearer.

Distribution 
This species is endemic to Southeast Asia (Indonesia, East and Southwest Java (Mount Semeru, Lumajang) and in Central Sumatra).

Habitat 
Paphiopedilum glaucophyllum has its natural habitat in rainy volcanic mountain slopes and moist limestone cliffs.

Gallery

References 

 Braem, G. J., Charles O. Baker, Margaret L. Baker. (1998) The Genus Paphiopedilum: Natural History and Cultivation, Vol. 1. Kissimmee, Florida: Botanical Publishers, Inc..
 Harold Koopowitz (2000) Revised Checklist of the Genus Paphiopedilum, A. 64, Nr. 4.
 Cribb, Phillip (1999) The Genus Paphiopedilum: A Kew Magazine Monograph 2nd Edition, Timber Press Inc.
 USDA GRIN

External links 
 
 
 Slipper Orchids
 Orchids

Endemic orchids of Indonesia
glaucophyllum
Endangered plants